Mevani is a village lying on the bank of the Bhavani River, near Gobichettipalayam (15 km), Erode District, Tamil Nadu.

Agriculture is the main occupation here.  Various films were shot in and around this village.  Pariyur kondathu Kaliamman Temple is near to this place.  A bridge connects Mevani with Keelvani, a village which lies on other side of the river.

It is one of the main film shooting spot in Erode District, films like super hit movie Karataatakaran to the latest release Sonna Puriyathu.

Paddy and Sugar Cane are cultivated the most and the "Bhavani River" serves as the main water resource.

Villages in Erode district